Rhythm Inn is a 1951 American film starring Jane Frazee.

Plot
Band leader Dusty Rhodes and his combo are in trouble with the local constabulary and are forced to put up their musical instruments in a music store as security for a loan to pay a fine. But, in order for the group to fulfill their commitment at the "Rhythm Inn", the band's singer, Carol Denton, prevails upon Eddie Thompson, who works at the store and is an amateur songwriter, to smuggle the instruments to the band each night without his employer's knowledge. Eddie's girlfriend, Betty Parker, misunderstands the relationship between Eddie and Carol, and complications arise.

Cast
 Jane Frazee as Carol Denton
 Kirby Grant as Dusty Rhodes
 Lois Collier as Betty Parker
 Armida as The Dancer

References

External links
 

1951 films
1951 comedy films
American black-and-white films
Monogram Pictures films
American comedy films
1950s English-language films
1950s American films